Samir Saba (born May 16, 1981), is a Dominican journalist and television producer and presenter. Saba is the producer of the TV  program Famosos Inside and presenter of the entertainment segments of the TV news programs Más que noticias and Enfoque Final,  broadcast on CDN 37.

Early life 
Saba was born May 16, 1981, in Santo Domingo, Dominican Republic. He studied primary and secondary school in the Santa Clara school of Santo Domingo and studied communication at the Santo Domingo Catholic University.

Career 
He started his professional career as a television presenter in 1997 in the TV program El país que queremos aired on CERTV channel 4, sponsored by UNICEF, for social change and action in the Dominican Republic. In 1998 he started working for the magazines Listin 2000, Evasión and Listeen , part of the Dominican newspaper Listín Diario. In 2000 Saba started working as a host in the radio show Milenium Site broadcast on Milenium 103.3FM.

Saba started working as an columnist for the renowned El Caribe newspaper in 2001 for the entertainment section and in 2005 returned to the TV as a reporter for the TV program De calle con Dafne broadcast on Teleantillas channel 2 and later continued as the presenter for the TV program Esquina 37 aired on CDN 37, which was the start of a career as a TV producer and presenter with the commercial broadcasting company.

He was the secretary of public relations for the Dominican Association of Art Critics (ACROARTE) from 2012 to 2014 and Secretary of International Relations from 2017 to 2019 and has remained an active member in the organization.

Samir Saba has been nominated for the ''Micrófono de Oro'' award by the Radio Hosts Association of the Dominican Republic and nominated for the National Youth Award in the Youth Journalism category by the Dominican government.

In 2019, the entertainment TV program Famosos Inside was awarded ''Best Entertainment TV program in the Caribbean'' in the 305 Latin Awards in Miami.

References

External links 
 Official Website

Dominican Republic journalists
People from Santo Domingo
Male journalists
1981 births
Living people
Dominican Republic people of Lebanese descent
White Dominicans